Divaneh may refer to:

Afghanistan
Dīvāneh, Farah
Dīvāneh, Kunduz

Iran
Divaneh, Iran, a village in Ilam Province, Iran